Whitmore Lake Public Schools was established in the year 1944. The schools were located just outside downtown Whitmore Lake, Michigan. Originally, the High School, Middle School, and Elementary School were built on the same land. Due to a few different aspects, one of which being the growth in the population of students, the district had to rebuild the Elementary School in 1991 and later, the High School in 2006. Whitmore Lake Public Schools is currently a School of Choice, meaning that to attend school at Whitmore Lake, it is not necessary to live within the boundaries of Whitmore Lake Public School District. Most parents who can choose to send their children to better districts.

Administration

The Administrative offices are located at 8845 Main Street, Whitmore Lake.

Primary School - Grades K-6
Whitmore Lake Elementary School was built in 1944, later (1991) moved from 8847 Main Street to 1077 Barker Road. The Elementary School contains Kindergarten through sixth grade. In 2007, there were 451 students enrolled at Whitmore Lake Elementary School. The female enrollment was 228 (50.5%) students, while the male enrollment was 223 (49.5%) students. The Kindergarten enrollment was 106 students (23.5% of the Elementary population). The first grade enrollment was 93 students (20.6% of the population). The second grade enrollment was 86 students (19% of the population). The third grade enrollment was 85 students (18.8% of population). The fourth grade enrollment was 81 (17.9% of the population). In 2012 the elementary school was labeled as a focus school.

Administration

Secondary School - Grades 7-12
The first graduating class from Whitmore Lake High School was not until after 1950, due to the fact that there was not a high school built at the same time that the rest of the district was established. The new high school was completed in 2006, becoming the first "green" (environmentally friendly) building of the school district. The current high school is located at 7430 Whitmore Lake Road. The high school participates in a program called the Early College Alliance (ECA). In 2007, there were 417 students enrolled at the high school. 202 (48.4%) of these students were female. The male population was made up of 215 students (51.6%). The ninth grade consisted of 124 students (29.7% of students). The tenth grade contained 119 students (28.5% of students). The eleventh grade was made up of 84 students (20.1% of students). The twelfth grade included 90 students (21.6% of students).

Administration

Early Childhood Center
The Early Childhood Center is located next to the Administrative offices at 8845 Main Street. The Early Childhood Center at Whitmore Lake is an attempt to prepare students for success in their future academic lives. Early Childhood Center contains Early Childhood Special Education, First Steps Washtenaw, Head Start, Tuition Preschool, Great Start Readiness Preschool Program, Kids Club, and Kids Club Kindergarten Enrichment Daily Schedule.

Administration

Community Relations & Recreation
Whitmore Lake Community Recreation hosts after school sports, swim lessons, exercise classes and open swim. The sports that Community Recreation is in charge of include: baseball, t-ball, softball, basketball, and soccer. The community pool is located in the South end of Whitmore Lake High School.

Staff

Board of Education

Members

References

School districts in Michigan
Schools in Livingston County, Michigan
Schools in Washtenaw County, Michigan
1944 establishments in Michigan
School districts established in 1944